Events from the year 1917 in Canada.

Incumbents

Crown 
Monarch – George V

Federal government 
Governor General – Victor Cavendish, 9th Duke of Devonshire 
Prime Minister – Robert Borden
Chief Justice – Charles Fitzpatrick (Quebec) 
Parliament – 12th (until 6 October)

Provincial governments

Lieutenant governors 
Lieutenant Governor of Alberta – Robert Brett 
Lieutenant Governor of British Columbia – Francis Stillman Barnard 
Lieutenant Governor of Manitoba – James Albert Manning Aikins  
Lieutenant Governor of New Brunswick – Josiah Wood (until June 29) then Gilbert Ganong (June 29 to October 31) then William Pugsley (from November 6) 
Lieutenant Governor of Nova Scotia – MacCallum Grant  
Lieutenant Governor of Ontario – John Strathearn Hendrie 
Lieutenant Governor of Prince Edward Island – Augustine Colin Macdonald 
Lieutenant Governor of Quebec – Pierre-Évariste Leblanc 
Lieutenant Governor of Saskatchewan – Richard Stuart Lake

Premiers 
Premier of Alberta – Arthur Sifton (until October 30) then Charles Stewart  
Premier of British Columbia – Harlan Brewster  
Premier of Manitoba – Tobias Norris 
Premier of New Brunswick – George Johnson Clarke (until February 1) then James A. Murray (February 1 to April 4) then Walter Foster 
Premier of Nova Scotia – George Henry Murray 
Premier of Ontario – William Hearst  
Premier of Prince Edward Island – John Mathieson (until June 21) then Aubin Arsenault 
Premier of Quebec – Lomer Gouin 
Premier of Saskatchewan – William Melville Martin

Territorial governments

Commissioners 
 Commissioner of Yukon – George Norris Williams (acting)
 Gold Commissioner of Yukon – George P. MacKenzie 
 Commissioner of Northwest Territories – Frederick D. White

Elections 
Provincial

June 7 – Alberta election: Arthur Sifton's Liberals win a fourth consecutive majority. Louise McKinney and Roberta MacAdams are elected to the Legislative Assembly of Alberta, the first two women elected to a legislature in the British Empire.
June 26 – Saskatchewan election: William Martin's Liberals win a fourth consecutive majority.

 Federal 
December 17: Robert Borden's Conservatives win a second consecutive majority in the Federal election

Events

January to June
February 1 – James Alexander Murray becomes premier of New Brunswick, replacing George Johnson Clarke
April 4 – Walter Foster becomes premier of New Brunswick, replacing Murray
April 9 – April 14 – Battle of Vimy Ridge.
April 17 – Leon Trotsky, en route from New York to Russia, is detained in Halifax. He will spend the next month in Amherst Internment Camp before being released.
June 21 – Aubin Arsenault becomes premier of Prince Edward Island, replacing John Mathieson

July to December
July 1: Canada celebrates its 50th Dominion Day.
August: The government introduces conscription triggering the Conscription Crisis of 1917
September 20: The Income War Tax Act receives royal assent, establishing a "temporary" tax, which remains in force to this day.
September 20: The Wartime Elections Act gives female relatives of servicemen the vote.
October 26 – November 10: Second Battle of Passchendaele.
October 30: Charles Stewart (1868–1946) becomes premier of Alberta, replacing Arthur Sifton
November 1 to 30: Swanson Bay, British Columbia, records  of precipitation for the month, which remains the highest officially recorded for one calendar month in North America.
December 6: Halifax Explosion kills 1,900 people and injures 9,000. The largest ever man-made explosion pre-Hiroshima atomic bomb.

Arts and literature
Tom Thomson paints The Jack Pine, one of Canada's most widely recognized and reproduced artworks.

Sport
March 26 – The Pacific Coast Hockey Association's Seattle Metropolitans become the first American team to win the Stanley Cup by defeating the National Hockey Association's Montreal Canadiens 3 games to 1. The Metropolitans won their only Cup in front of their home crowd at Seattle Ice Arena
November 26 – The National Hockey League (NHL) is established in Montreal, with 4 teams from the National Hockey Association (Montreal Canadiens, Montreal Wanderers, Ottawa Senators, and Quebec Bulldogs) The owners would form a new team in Toronto due to a dispute Toronto Blueshirts owner Eddie Livingstone, the Toronto Hockey Club (Toronto Maple Leafs)
December 19 – Montreal Wanderers defeat the Toronto Arenas in the first NHL game.

Births

January to June
January 6 – Sydney Banks, broadcaster and producer (d.2006)
January 11 – John Robarts, lawyer, politician and 17th Premier of Ontario (d.1982)
April 11 – Danny Gallivan, radio and television broadcaster and sportscaster (d. 1993)
April 25 – George R. Gardiner, businessman, philanthropist and co-founder of the Gardiner Museum (d.1997)
May 12 – Frank Clair, Canadian Football League coach (d.2005)
May 19 – Robert Gordon Robertson, civil servant and 7th Commissioner of the Northwest Territories (d.2013)
May 21 – Raymond Burr, actor (d.1993)
May 22 – Lude Check, ice hockey player (d.2009)
May 24 – Ross Thatcher, politician and 9th Premier of Saskatchewan (d.1971)
June 17 – Dufferin Roblin, businessman, politician and 14th Premier of Manitoba (d.2010)
June 18 – Arthur Tremblay, politician and Senator (d.1996)
June 29 – Archie Green, folklorist and musicologist (d.2009)

July to December
July 17 – John Hayes, harness racing driver, trainer and owner (d. 1998)
September 12 – Pierre Sévigny, soldier, author, politician and academic (d. 2004)
September 15 – Alf Pike, ice hockey player and coach (d. 2009)
September 26 – Réal Caouette, politician (d. 1976)
November 2 – Ann Rutherford, actress (Gone with the Wind, The Secret Life of Walter Mitty). (d. 2012)
November 11 – Abram Hoffer, orthomolecular psychiatrist (d. 2009)
November 28 – Jacob Froese, politician (d. 2003)
December 6 – Irv Robbins, Canadian-American entrepreneur (d. 2008)

Full date unknown
Kent Rowley, labour activist and union organizer (d. 2013)
Jack Singer, businessman and philanthropist (d. 2013)

Deaths

January to June
January 8 – Ward Bowlby, lawyer and politician, reeve of Berlin, Ontario (born 1834) 
January 14 – Alexander Cameron, physician and politician (b.1834)
February 17 – Ralph Smith, coal miner, labour leader and politician (b.1858)
February 26 – George Johnson Clarke, lawyer, journalist, politician and 14th Premier of New Brunswick (b.1857)
April 21 – George Thomas Baird, politician, Senator for Victoria, New Brunswick (b. 1847)
June 13 – Louis-Philippe Hébert, sculptor (b.1850)

July to December
July 5 – Percival Molson, athlete and soldier (b.1880)
July 8 – Tom Thomson, artist (b.1877)
July 15 – Lemuel John Tweedie, politician and 9th premier of New Brunswick (b.1849)
August 6 – Richard McBride, politician and Premier of British Columbia (b.1870)

August 29 – Albert Grey, 4th Earl Grey, 9th governor general of Canada (b.1851)
October 31 – Gilbert Ganong, businessman, politician and Lieutenant Governor of New Brunswick (b.1851)
November 10 – Thomas Simpson Sproule, politician and Speaker of the House of Commons of Canada (b.1843)
October 30 – Talbot Papineau, lawyer and soldier (b.1883)
December 10 – Mackenzie Bowell, politician and 5th prime minister of Canada (b.1823)

Historical documents
Army chaplain explains why Canadians should reject peace offers at this time

Woman recalls being six-year-old in family caught in Halifax Explosion

Victoria Cross citation for Ukrainian-Canadian soldier's bravery in battle

Battle of Vimy Ridge described by Canadian signalman observing battlefront

Amputee says horrors of Somme fighting worse than losing his arm there

Recuperating Canadian soldier describes birdsong, currant and hawthorn blossoms and other beauties of spring in England

Frontline doctor treats (and changes mind of) German prisoner of war

Letter of thanks from soldier receiving socks, saying all intend to see war won

Letter of thanks from soldier receiving socks, describing Christmas dinner

International planning consultant advises against special programs to set up returning soldiers in agriculture

Profile of Medicine Hat, Alta. branch of Great War Veterans Association

"That woman suffrage will help the cause of Temperance is shown by the following facts"

In inaugural address, President Wilson says U.S.A. cannot be independent of war, but is not part of it

American upset over Canadian hostility to U.S. non-participation in World War I

Poster for U.S. vs Canada charity baseball game in London, U.K.

Prosecution's opening statement in trial of Inuk for murder on Coppermine River

Modern conveniences would save farm women from lifting tons of water a day

"The increase of fibre decreases digestibilty" - Ontario Agricultural College researcher on limited usefulness of whole-wheat flour

Calgary mayor agrees that door-to-door distribution of flyers for birth control play should be prohibited

References

 
Years of the 20th century in Canada
Canada
Canada